Rimlan-e Pain (also Romanized as Rīmlān-e Pā’īn) is a village in Sand-e Mir Suiyan Rural District, Dashtiari District, Chabahar County, Sistan and Baluchestan Province, Iran. At the 2006 census, its population was 137, in 41 families.

References 

Populated places in Chabahar County